Turbonilla aquilonaria is a species of sea snail, a marine gastropod mollusk in the family Pyramidellidae, the pyrams and their allies.

Description
The shell grows to a length of 4.7 mm.

Distribution
This marine species was found in the intertidal zone, near Cabo de Santo Agostinho, Pernambuco State, Brazil

References

External links
 To Encyclopedia of Life
 To World Register of Marine Species

aquilonaria
Gastropods described in 2003